Pers is a former commune in the Cantal department in south-central France. On 1 January 2016, it was merged into the new commune Le Rouget-Pers.

It is on the edge of the Châtaigneraie and near the Ségala. It is also adjacent to the lake of Saint-Étienne-Cantalès, a large body of water formed by the damming of the river Cère for hydro electric purposes.

The village also has a very good go-cart track, and regularly hosts championship races.

As well as the church and the town hall, there are two bars, and a camping site. Gites may also be rented from the farm. There are no shops.

Population

See also
Communes of the Cantal department

References

Former communes of Cantal
Populated places disestablished in 2016